Duppituru is located in Visakhapatnam state of Andhra Pradesh, India.

About
Duppituru in Atchutapuram Mandal and Andhra Pradesh Special Economic Zone situated in this village.

References

Neighbourhoods in Visakhapatnam